Osteobrama neilli is a species of ray-finned fish in the genus Osteobrama.

Overview 
Osteobrama neilli is a small freshwater Minnow endemic to fast flowing clear streams and rivers in the Western Ghats in the states of Maharashtra, Karnataka, Andhra Pradesh and Tamil Nadu. Fully growing to be no longer than 5 inches, the fish is inedible, and therefore only used as bait. Its appearance is a small silver colored minnow with black stripes perpendicular to its body. Osteobrama neilli is rated least concern by IUCN for endangerment.

References 

 

Neilli
Fish described in 1873